The 1895 Brown Bears football team represented Brown University as an independent during the 1895 college football season. Led by first-year head coach Wallace Moyle, Brown compiled a record of 7–6–1.

Schedule

References

Brown
Brown Bears football seasons
Brown Bears football